Hendrik van Nee (13 August 1939 — 25 January 1996) was a Dutch footballer who played as a forward from 1957 to 1971.

Born in Zwolle, he played for Zwolsche Boys, Heracles Almelo (two spells), PEC Zwolle, GVAV, Kickers Offenbach, La Gantoise (now K.A.A. Gent), Cercle Brugge and Haarlem.

Van Nee earned five caps and scored twice for the Netherlands at international level. He made his debut on 30 September 1964, in a 1–0 loss away to Belgium in the Low Countries derby. He scored in both games he played of the Dutch team's failed 1966 FIFA World Cup qualification campaign: a 2–0 win away to Albania on 25 October 1964 and a 2–1 loss away to Northern Ireland the following 17 March.

References

1939 births
1996 deaths
Sportspeople from Zwolle
Association football forwards
Dutch footballers
Netherlands international footballers
Heracles Almelo players
PEC Zwolle players
GVAV players
Kickers Offenbach players
K.A.A. Gent players
Cercle Brugge K.S.V. players
HFC Haarlem players
Eredivisie players
Eerste Divisie players
Tweede Divisie players
Regionalliga players
Belgian Pro League players
Challenger Pro League players
Dutch expatriate footballers
Dutch expatriate sportspeople in Germany
Dutch expatriate sportspeople in Belgium
Expatriate footballers in Belgium
Expatriate footballers in Germany
Footballers from Overijssel